Frank Traynor (2 June 1904 – 23 February 1991) was an Irish boxer. He competed in the men's bantamweight event at the 1928 Summer Olympics.

References

External links
 

1904 births
1991 deaths
Irish male boxers
Olympic boxers of Ireland
Boxers at the 1928 Summer Olympics
Sportspeople from Dublin (city)
Bantamweight boxers